Modern Theosophy has had considerable influence on the work of visual artists, particularly painters. Artists such as Wassily Kandinsky, Piet Mondrian, and Luigi Russolo chose Theosophy as the main ideological and philosophical basis of their work.

Theosophical colour mysticism 

The Theosophical teaching on the human aura was elaborated by Charles W. Leadbeater and Rudolf Steiner in early 1900s. Both Leadbeater and Steiner stated that "clairvoyants" are gifted of seeing so-called "thought-forms" and "human auras." They have also written that the "impressions" received by such people from the "higher worlds" are similar with the "colour phenomena observed in the physical world."

Nicholas Goodrick-Clarke pointed out that Annie Besant in collaboration with Leadbeater has also published an "influential book" titled Thought-Forms, a record of clairvoyant investigation. The frontispieces of both Thought-Forms and  contain a table "The meanings of colours" of thought-forms and human aura associated with feelings and emotions, beginning with "High Spirituality" (light blue—in the upper left corner) and ending by "Malice" (black—in the lower right corner), 25 colors in all. According to Besant and Leadbeater, feelings and thoughts shape specific forms, for example, "lightning-like shapes" emerge in connection with "anger" and "malice," zig-zag lines show fear etc.

Thus, thanks to Besant, with Leadbeater and Steiner, the "Theosophical colour mysticism", as Sixten Ringbom has formulated, became a subject in which modern artists have been particularly interested. In addition, they were attracted by the Theosophical concept of a "universal harmony underlying the apparent chaos" of the physical world.

Theosophists as artists

Blavatsky 

Helena Blavatsky (1831–1891) had a developed gift for drawing, "but no pretensions as an artist." Massimo Introvigne wrote that "the first of a long list of Theosophical painters was none other than Madame Blavatsky herself." Paul Weinzweig spoke about her as "a completely cultured woman in the renaissance ideal." He noted that Blavatsky was a "scientist, poet, pianist, painter, philosopher, writer, educator."

Machell 

Reginald Willoughby Machell (1854–1927) was educated first at Uppingham School, then at Owen's College, having taken "many prizes in drawing and also in the classics." At last, he was sent to study in Paris at the Académie Julian. In 1880, he returned to London and worked as a portrait painter. In 1893, he was elected a member of the Royal Society of British Artists. He created also illustrations to the books An Idol's Passion (1895) and The Chant of a Lonely Soul (1897) by an American novelist Irene Osgood.

In 1887, Machell was introduced to Blavatsky herself by a friend of one of his aunts. In 1888, he joined the Theosophical Society. His paintings began to obtain a mystical and symbolist character. It may be related with such his works as Dweller on the Threshold, The Birth of the Planet, and Lead Kindly Light. Machell's Theosophical art had its "triumph" in The Path (1895). He described this painting as follows:
THE PATH is the way by which the human soul must pass it its evolution to full spiritual self-consciousness. The supreme condition is suggested in this work by the great figure whose head in the upper triangle is lost in the glory of the Sun above, and whose feet are in the lower triangle in the waters of Space, symbolizing Spirit and Matter. His wings fill the middle region representing the motion or pulsation of cosmic life, while within the octagon are displayed the various planes of consciousness, through which humanity must rise to attain a perfect Manhood. At the top is a winged Isis, the Mother or Oversoul whose wings veil the face of the Supreme from those below. There is a circle dimly seen of celestial figures who hail with joy the triumph of a new initiate, one who has reached to the heart of the Supreme. From that point he looks back with compassion upon all who still are wandering below and turns to go down again to their help as a Saviour of Men. Below him is the red ring of the guardians who strike down those who have not the "password," symbolized by the white flame floating over the head of the purified aspirant. Two children, representing purity, pass up unchallenged. In the centre of the picture is a warrior who has slain the dragon of illusion, the dragon of the lower self, and is now prepared to cross the gulf by using the body of the dragon as his bridge (for we rise on steps made of conquered weaknesses, the slain dragon of the lower nature).
His painting Vision of the New Day continues a theme of The Path. The New Day is a symbol of enlightenment, which the human soul can achieve, avoiding the temptations of materialism.

In 1900, Machell moved to the United States and joined the Theosophical community at Point Loma established by Katherine Tingley.

Schmiechen 

Hermann Schmiechen (1855–1923) joined the Theosophical Society in London on 20 June 1884. And, fulfilling the request of Blavatsky, he began to paint portraits of the Theosophical Masters. The portrait of the Master Koot Hoomi she assessed as "excellent" and immediately asked Schmiechen to begin working on a portrait of the Master Morya. It took him about three weeks, to complete these paintings. Some authors believe that Schmichen's work was a kind of "psychic experiment", and images of the Masters were transmitted to him telepathically. In Introvigne's opinion, the most significant portraits of the mahatmas "in Theosophical history" were painted by Schmiechen.

Brendan French made examination these portraits and, according to his conclusions, he stated that
Schmiechen 
appears to have been significantly influenced by the Venetian cinquecento, in particular by the deceptive tranquillity of Titian's portraiture; equally, he seems to be enamoured of Rembrandt's psychologically-pregnant portraits... That the Masters' portraits should resonate with Christological overtones is hardly surprising. Schmiechen, like most Western artists concerned to invest their images with qualities of transcendence, turned for inspiration to the foundational iconographical type of divine-human hypostasis, the Biblical Christ. The iconic potentialities of a Christ portrait were imported by Schmiechen into his own depiction of semi-divinised men, the Masters. Indeed, he employed several standard devices: an undifferentiated background; over-large, staring eyes; a frontal composition designed to focus attention directly upon the subject's confronting gaze; a sense of sagacity heightened by indications of the sitter's self-possession; no distracting detail in vestment or jewellery; and a framing of the features by long hair and a beard.

Klint 

Hilma af Klint (1862–1944) "experimented with automatic drawing in a Spiritualist setting." She joined the Theosophical Society Adyar
on May 23, 1904. In 1920, af Klint became a member of the Anthroposophical Society and began "spending long periods in Dornach." The Theosophical and Anthroposophical ideas were a source of the inspiration for many of her paintings. She painted "several series of impressive paintings exploring spiritual or sacred concepts". Her unique style united, in Tessel Bauduin's opinion, "geometric and biomorphic form with a free line". Af Klint considered abstract art to be the "spiritual precursor of a utopian social harmony, a world of tomorrow." According to Introvigne, only recently, after several exhibitions in different countries, she was recognized as an important European abstract artist.

Fuller 

Florence Fuller (1867–1946) joined the Theosophical Society in 1905. In the same year, she created A Golden Hour "widely regarded as a national Australian masterpiece." From 1908 to 1911 in Adyar, she painted portraits of the leaders of the Theosophical Society and the Theosophical Masters.

In Adyar, Fuller created an "unknown number" of portraits of the mahatmas, including the Lord Buddha. Of these, only a portrait of the Master Buddha has been published. In Brendan French's opinion, this portrait illustrates reducing "sex characteristics, and thus appear androgynous." He argued this is "founded in Renaissance angelology." According to McFarlane, Fuller chose the colors for this painting in full accordance with the Theosophical canon expounded in Thought-Forms by Besant and Leadbeater.

Mondrian 

In the early 1900s, Piet Mondrian (1872–1944) had read the Theosophical literature with great interest, including  by Édouard Schuré. He joined the Dutch Section of the TS in 1909. As Carel Blotkamp stated, "It is abundantly clear that Theosophy was of crucial importance to Mondrian."

Michel Seuphor wrote that Mondrian's religion "went from Calvinism to Theosophy and from Theosophy to Neoplasticism," that had included Theosophy and became his main world-view. Mondrian believed that his neoplastic concept should in the "most objective and rational way possible transmit" the Theosophical idea of the Absolute. In his opinion, the neoplastic art will in future replace religion. And artist's role – "as priest of this religious art – will consist in helping the common man reach the desired after inner balance."

Mondrian chose for his "monumental triptych" Evolution, a theme which is one of the main doctrines in the Theosophical teaching. According to Robert Welsh, the blue and yellow colors used in the work can be explained as astral "shells or radiations" of the figures. Can be thought that these personages take part in the Theosophical initiation. However, one should examine them as the same person "viewed in three complementary aspects." If go in the order "left, right, and center," we have a standard mystical advancement "from matter through soul to spirit." In Isis Unveiled, Blavatsky wrote:
Three spirits live and actuate man, teaches Paracelsus; three worlds pour their beams upon him; but all three only as the image and echo of one and the same all-constructing and uniting principle of production. The first is the spirit of the elements (terrestrial body and vital force in its brute condition); the second, the spirit of the stars (sidereal or astral body—the soul); the third is the Divine spirit (Augoeidés).

Roerich 

Nicholas Roerich (1874–1947) and his wife Helena created Agni Yoga, a "Theosophically inspired form of esotericism." This "neo-Theosophical" doctrine was first explained in 1929. Introvigne designated the Roerichs' doctrine as a "Theosophical schism." According to Joscelyn Godwin, Roerich was "probably the most thoroughly Theosophical of 20th-century painters, although opinions of his merit vary."

Artists and Theosophy

Kandinsky 

Even before 1910, Wassily Kandinsky (1866–1944) studied the Theosophical books of Blavatsky, Besant and Leadbeater, Steiner, and Schuré. In 1912, he wrote in his main theoretical work Über das Geistige in der Kunst on the importance of Theosophy "for his art". According to Boris Falikov, Theosophy helped Kandinsky conceptually to comprehend creative and spiritual experiences, which, as he understood, "more and more merged into a single whole." The works by Blavatsky, Steiner, and their like-minded people helped him not only to conceptualize his experience, but also to formulate his own mission, which combined the artistic and religious dimension. He comprehended that he was an active participant in the turn to the spiritual world about which "Theosophy prophesied."

In his treatise, Kandinsky stated that Blavatsky began "one of the greatest spiritual movements which unites a great number of people and which also has established a material form of this spiritual phenomenon in the Theosophical Society." He presented a long quotation from Blavatsky's book The Key to Theosophy:
A new herald of truth will find the minds of men prepared for his message... A new manner of expression is created in which to clothe the new truths, an organization which will await his arrival, and will then proceed to remove the merely material obstacles and difficulties from his path.
According to Ringbom, in the "General Part" of his treatise, Kandinsky has actually repeated Schuré's introduction into the Theosophical doctrine. This fact is confirmed his "polemic against materialism, positivism and scepticism, the references to spiritism and psychical research as proofs of the approaching spiritual synthesis of science, religion and art." Rose-Carol Washton-Long wrote that Theosophy convinced Kandinsky that "hidden imagery could be a powerful method" of conveying the spiritual ideas. In his lexicon, Leadbeater's concept of vibration was fixed for life. He used it in his "most famous image" of creativity: 
Colour is a means of exercising direct influence upon the soul. Colour is the keyboard. The eye is the hammer, while the soul is a piano of many strings. The artist is the hand through which the medium of the corresponding keys causes the human soul to vibrate. It is, thus, evident that colour harmony can rest only on the principle of the corresponding touch to the human soul.

Lechter 

Melchior Lechter (1865–1937) studied painting at the Hochschule der Künste, Berlin. In 1896 at Berlin, he had his first exhibition. He was also a publisher, founder the Unicorn Press, and "had an interest in Theosophy." In his paintings and writings, Lechter integrated "ideas of both the medieval German and the ancient Indian mystics."

Lechter had "his own ideas" about the nature of colour. For example, he believed that Rembrandt in his picture  had expressed the "smouldering lewdness of the woman through the yellowish brown mud-colour of her cloak which, moreover, looked as if it were moist." He also argued that expressive quality of the colours by which a "painter could symbolize the character of his subject" was the artistic reproduction of a natural phenomenon, because, in his opinion, "from everyone a special variegated aura emanates which, however, could only be seen by people who were endowed with a special faculty." Jan Stottmeister called Lechter's worldview the "Theosophical Catholicism", since he explained the esoteric significance of "his exoteric Catholicism" with quotations from The Secret Doctrine by Blavatsky and Thought-Forms by Besant and Leadbeater.

Kupka 

František Kupka (1871–1957) had been a "practicing spiritist medium" in Prague and Vienna before his moving to Paris in 1896. Like Kandinsky, he "found inspiration in Theosophy and the occult, and promoted a subjective-intuitive approach to art." Among the Theosophical sources, Besant and Leadbeater's book Thought-Forms had great influence for him. He interested in the Theosophical theory of colour as well as scientific one. Like Mondrian, Kupka accepted an idea on the fourth dimension "as a supplement" to his Theosophical faith.

In Chelsea Jones' opinion, Kupka's painting The Dream (1909) confirms his "interest in Buddhism, Theosophy, and science and represents his belief in the immaterial." She wrote that this work also demonstrates the "Theosophical notion" on astral vision:
In The Dream, Kupka presented a vision of invisible reality. Here the imaginary floating forms dominate the scene; they dwarf the forms of visible reality, as represented by the fleshy forms lying in sleep. Through the variation in scale between the dream figures and their earthly forms, Kupka clearly made the painting about an experience of invisible reality with the immaterial dominating the material.

Beckmann 

Max Beckmann (1884–1950) was, like both Mondrian and Kandinsky, interested in the "Theosophical theory" of Blavatsky and also began to study the Vedas and Indian philosophy.

In Vladimir Ivanov's opinion, Beckmann's painting the Death requires the Theosophical commentary, without which the meaning of the composition is impossible to understand. Obviously, depicting death, Beckman "relied" on the knowledge he had learned from reading the Theosophical literature. The composition includes the moment of development in time, passing into the timeless (astral) dimension: various stages of post-mortem states are shown. Ivanov stated that the painter introduced the post-mortem experiences of a person burdened with vices. The upper part of the painting is compositionally dominant over the lower one in its meaning and value. Another peculiarity is that the picture represents different time phases and existential states. In the middle is a strange image of the creature with an extinguished candle. Six trotters peek out from under the robe, that immediately makes it clear about the astral nature of this character. The transition from the earthly to the supersensible is traced. Further action takes place in the upper part of the composition, which needs a "hermetic" interpretation.

Theosophy represents death as "a long process consisting of various changing phases." The first phase is connected with the experience of kâmaloka. Besant explained it as follows: "Kâmaloka,  literally the place or habitat of desire, is... a part of the astral plane, not divided from it as a distinct locality, but separated off by the conditions of consciousness of the entities belonging to it." Beckman wanted to show that the selection and objectification of ended life memories occurs in kâmaloka. According to Ivanov, the monsters at the top of the composition are "nothing more than the objectification of the mental states of the deceased woman." Besant wrote that the first experience after death will be the seeing of the "panorama" of the past life, which at the "death hour" unfolds before every dead in all the experienced details. She stated that "he sees his ambitions with their success or frustration... the predominant tendency of the whole comes clearly out, the ruling thought of the life asserts itself, and stamps itself deeply into the soul, marking the region in which the chief part of his post-mortem existence will be spent." The double structure of the composition Death should be also explained from the Theosophical point of view, because the viewing life after death is done in reverse order: from end to beginning. Ivanov referred on Steiner who has written: "During the time of purification man, as it were, lives his life in reverse order... He begins with the events that immediately preceded death and experiences everything in reverse order back to childhood." Other facts, events, and beings in the astral world are also accepted in reverse order. Leadbeater said that the clairvoyant will find it difficult to be aware of what he sees, and even more difficult of that—to put into words everything he observed. A vivid example of the misconceptions that an observer may undergo is the reverse placement of numbers reflected in the "astral light". For example, 931 instead of 139, and so on. Therefore, the characters depicted upside down in the upper part of the composition testify to the painter knowledge of the laws of the astral plane.

Beckmann was uncommonly "impressed" by The Secret Doctrine which he ended to read in 1934. Then he made several different sketches "on the theme" of its second volume Anthropogenesis. The album with these sketches is in the National Gallery (Washington, D.C.). Along with sketches in the album there are excerpts from this book by Blavatsky. A series of sketches is devoted to the development of motives, which then found their finished expression in the work Early Men.

Russolo 

Luigi Russolo (1885–1947) had interest in occultism and Theosophy. In Luciano Chessa's opinion, Theosophy is the "key" that makes it possible to "identify, decode, and contextualize" Russolo's interest in the occult, which is present in his compositions: from his "printmaking and paintings" to his theoretical works on music.

In creativity of Russolo, the Theosophical ideas had been first used in his etching and aquatint Masks (1908). His reading the Theosophical books by Besant and Leadbeater on sound-forms "probably influenced one of his most icastic" paintings, Force Lines of Lightning (1912). The triangular picture of the shock wave in this painting is "extraordinarily close" to the depiction of the sound-forms of a thunderstorm, which described in Leadbeater's The Hidden Side of Things: "The majestic roll of a thunderstorm creates usually a vast flowing band of colour, while the deafening crash often calls into temporary existence an arrangement of irregular radiations... or sometimes a huge irregular sphere with spikes projecting from it in all directions."

Chessa wrote that Russolo's painting La musica represents, according to Leadbeater, "the hidden side of the performance of a piece of music."
The painting demonstrates a pianist playing in a "state of rapturous enthusiasm." The lines of his face can hardly be distinguished. His hands are "represented in a mad, virtuosic dash along an infinite keyboard." This work, like Maschere, shows a series of flying masks with various expressions that can readily be interpreted as a "visualization or materialization of the different states of mind" of a pianist-medium, which performed by spirits he himself has summoned. The authors of Thought-Forms explained that the spirits that "reside in the astral plane have the energy to change the course of thought-forms that already exist, and to make them move." In Chessa's opinion, this painting is "structured according to criteria presented in Thought-Forms, in particular the section of the book that describes the forms produced by music."

Ginna 
Arnaldo Ginna (born Arnaldo Ginanni Corradini; 1890–1982), like Kandinsky, had theoretical works on the arts (for example, Arte dell'avvenire [Art of the Future], 1910 and Pittura dell'avvenire [Painting of the Future], 1915).
Germano Celant called him "the most esoteric" futurist, pointing out his interest in the Theosophical and occult literature. Among his publications it can found those that contain cites from Thought-Forms and Man Visible and Invisible.

In 1908, Ginna painted a picture Neurasthenia that could be described as a piece of abstract art. In this painting, "he tried to portray a state of mind." Neurasthenia is the first thing of abstract painting, for it "preceded Kandinsky's first abstract water colour by two years."

Illustrators 

In the esotericism researchers' opinion, illustrations to the book Thought-Forms, which were made by John Varley, Mr. Prince, and Miss Macfarlane, are "very reminiscent of much abstract and surrealistic painting" and "wouldn't look out of place hanging alongside early Malevich or Kandinsky abstractions." Nevertheless, authors of the book fully directed a working of the artists who embodied their ideas and their vision.

Count  (1849–1928) has painted illustrations to Leadbeater's book Man Visible and Invisible.

Alfred Edward Warner (1879–1968) had in Sydney his own commercial art studio. In 1923, he became a member of the Australian Painter-Etcher's Society and was in its Council at 1923–1925. In 1923, he was also one of the founders of the Australian Ex Libris Society. For several years Warner successfully collaborated with Leadbeater, illustrating his books, in particular, The Science of the Sacraments. On his illustration The Completed Eucharistic Form "the thought-form takes a mosque-like appearance with minarets rising from the church to envelop and influence the surrounding countryside." In preface to his , Leadbeter wrote that the "fine series of drawings" to the book was made by Edward Warner.

In 1937, painter Ethelwynne M. Quail has performed illustrations to the Theosophical book Kingdom of the Gods based upon Geoffrey Hodson's "researches, carried out between 1921 and 1929." The book author noted, "As she has painted them to my descriptions, she is responsible only for their execution, not for their composition, colouring or form."

Controversy 
In 1947, Terence Harold Robsjohn-Gibbings (1905–1976), criticizing modern art, accused it of "vicious connection" with the occult.  Robsjohn-Gibbings' criticism was so "successful that, for decades, supporters of abstract art religiously avoided mentioning the esoteric connections of its pioneers." Interest in Theosophy of such abstract art leaders as Mondrian and Kandinsky was used "as a weapon" against modern art in general "by evangelical Christians and other critics."

The prejudgment against connection the sources of modern art with Theosophy still exists. For example, art history scholar Yve-Alain Bois claimed that "the Theosophical nonsense with which the artist's mind was momentarily encumbered" disappeared quite rapidly from Mondrian's art, but Mondrian himself wrote: "I got everything from The Secret Doctrine." The "Inventing Abstraction, 1910–1925" exhibition at the New York Museum of Modern Art in 2012–2013 "completely ignored" the value of occultism and Theosophy. Art critic Waldemar Januszczak wrote on 7 February 2010:
The fact is, Theosophy... is embarrassing. If there is one thing you do not want your hardcore modernist to be, it is a member of an occult cult... Theosophy takes art into Dan Brown territory. No serious student of art history wants to touch it.
Januszczak claimed also that Theosophy was "fraudulent" and "ridiculous," and that "one day, someone will write a big book on the remarkable influence of Theosophy on modern art" and "its nonsensical spell" on so many modern artists. But, as Introvigne stated, "conferences, publications, and exhibitions about Theosophy's influence on modern art continue at an increasing pace."

See also 
 Philosophy of art
 Theosophy and literature
 Thought-Forms
 "What Are The Theosophists?"
 "What Is Theosophy?"

Notes

References

Sources

Academic publications

Other publications

In Russian

Theosophical publications

Further reading

External links 
 List of the Theosophical publications about Arts

Abstract art
Art history
Theosophy
Visual arts by religion